Manila Central University (MCU), formerly known as the Escuela de Farmacia del Liceo de Manila, is a private, non-sectarian, stock basic and higher education institution located on EDSA, Caloocan, Philippines. It was founded in 1904 by Dr. Alejandro M. Albert who also was its first Director.

MCU is the first Pharmacy school run by Filipinos, and the first Nursing school that offered the 4-year Bachelor of Science in Nursing program in the Philippines.

The patron of the university is Minerva.

MCU was a member university of the University Athletic Association of the Philippines from 1952 to 1962.

History

In 1903, at the request of several students from the University of Santo Tomas and other nearby schools, Dr. Alejandro M. Albert organized a private review class.

The review class developed into the Escuela de Farmacia del Liceo de Manila in 1904, with Dr. Albert as the founder and director. Later on, due to the steady increase in enrollment, it was transformed into the Manila College of Pharmacy, with Dr. Leon Ma. L. Guerrero, Antonio C. Llamas, Feliciano P. Paterno and Atty. Filemon D. Tanchoco Sr. as the incorporators. It was the first educational institution of its kind established and managed by Filipinos. Its initial organization was barely four years after the establishment of the Philippine education system.

In 1929 its board of trustees, answering a long-felt need for the training of the youth for dental services, opened the college of Dentistry. Manila College of Pharmacy became then the Manila College of Pharmacy and Dentistry in the pre-war era. Second World War closed its portals in 1941.

During the Japanese occupation, the enemy looted its facilities, laboratory, equipment, and museums. During the liberation period, it was further looted of everything but the shell of its two buildings.

After the liberation of the Philippines, the Board of Trustees reorganized the college into Manila Central Colleges.

In addition to Pharmacy and Dentistry, the reorganized institution offered courses in liberal arts, education, commerce, business administration and postgraduate courses in pharmacy. In 1947, the College of Medicine was added. In 1948, it became the Manila Central University after opening the College of Nursing and Graduate School.

In 1949, the MCU inaugurated its 10-hectare campus in Caloocan. The colleges of Optometry and Midwifery, and the High School and Kindergarten departments were opened.

The university's varsity team, the Tigers, competed in the University Athletic Association of the Philippines from 1952 to 1962.  MCU's best finish in the centerpiece seniors basketball tournament was runner-up to University of the East in 1958.

Colleges
 College of Medicine
 College of Nursing
 College of Pharmacy
 College of Dentistry
 College of Optometry
 College of Medical Technology
 College of Physical Therapy
 College of Arts and Sciences
 School of Business and Management
 Institute of Education
 Graduate School
 Basic Education Department

Dalit ng MCU
 
Pamantasan nating ito,
Magiting na MCU.
Pag-asa nitong bayan,
Sandigan man din ng karangalan.
Ang bandila nating mahal,
Sagisag gintong aral.
Sigla at lakas natin,
Alay sa kanya habang may buhay.

Chorus:
Ang awit, tinig na ito,
Likha ng diwa at puso ko.
Isamo natin at ipagdasal,
Katarungan ay kamtan.
Laging handa, lagi kaming laan,
Ipagtanggol kanyang ngalan.

University logo
 

Elements in the university logo:
 Torch of Knowledge: symbol for learning
 Minerva: Goddess of Wisdom
 Caduceus: symbolizes the science courses offered by the university
 Book: For education courses
 Mortar: Pharmacy logo (first college founded)
 Academic Freedom: circle (strong foundation), triangle (justice and equality)
 Mercury: fast delivery of service
 Laurel and Leaves: prestige and honor
Circle : MCU community

Timeline
1904 A private review class for pharmacy students was institutionalized as the Escuela de Farmacia del Liceo de Manila, the first school of Pharmacy run by Filipinos, with Dr. Alejandro M. Albert as the founder and director. Classes were conducted in the building later occupied by Avenue Theater in Rizal Avenue, Manila. Dr. Albert held the school directorship until 1908.
1908 The Escuela produced its first batch of graduates. Among them were Filomena Francisco Guerrero and Matilde Arquiza Arroyo, the first Filipina pharmacists.
1913 Atty. Filemon D. Tanchoco Sr. (Bachelor of Science in Pharmaceutical Chemistry, 1910) placed second in the Pharmacists Licensure Examination.
1915 The Escuela was transformed into Manila College of Pharmacy, with Dr. Leon Ma. L. Guerrero, Antonio C. Llamas, Feliciano P. Paterno and Atty. Tanchoco as incorporators.  The school was authorized to confer postgraduate and doctoral degrees in Pharmacy. The college was housed in a new building at the corner of Oroquieta and Zurbaran in Manila. With Dr. Guerrero appointed as the country's representative to the Panama Pacific Exposition, Dr. Albert became the school director. 
1917 Francisco Casas (BS Pharmacy, 1917) placed third in the Pharmacy Board Exams.
1926 Construction began on a new building at the corner of Mayhaligue and Felix Huertas in Manila.
1929 The College of Dentistry was founded. The institution became the Manila College of Pharmacy and Dentistry. Dr. Genaro Felizardo, who organized the college, served as acting head of college until appointment of Dr. Jose Francisco as the first dean. 
1936 The college started developing competencies in mineral analysis with the creation of the mineral assaying department.
1937 Bella P. Cruz–Nicolas (B.S. Pharmacy) placed first in the Pharmacy Board Exams.
1938 The college began offering secondary education through Albert High School. The college started making laundry soap and later produced medicated soap.
1941 The college closed its doors as the Second World War breaks out. Japanese forces occupied its buildings and systematically looted its extensive facilities, laboratory, equipment, museum, among others, leaving only the shell of its two buildings.
1945 The demise of two founders and the incapacitation of two others left Atty. Tanchoco with the task of reviving the college. He and his wife Purificacion Gallego-Tanchoco, reopened the school with a new wing — the College of Liberal Arts. With Dr. Alfredo Guerrero as dean, the school was renamed the Manila College of Pharmacy and Liberal Arts.
1946 Further expansion followed with the setting up of the College of Education, the Normal Department and the Elementary Department. The Board of Trustees reorganized the College into the Manila Central Colleges with Atty. Filemon Tanchoco as chairman and Dr. Alfredo L. Guerrero as the dean of the College of Pharmacy. The Liberal Arts and Education colleges and the Normal Department were grouped under the Allied Colleges. Acting Dean Magdaleno Arellano was succeeded by Dr. Eugenia Reus-Beucler, an alumna, a year later.
1947 Responding to an appeal from students and community to continue operating the College of Medicine and Surgery after the death of its founder, the MCC acquired its facilities. Thus was born the MCC's College of Medicine, with Dr. Alfredo Guerrero as the first dean. The College of Nursing was also opened after the Bureau of Private Schools granted MCC the permit to operate the first year of a four- year course. Permit to operate subsequent years of the course were secured after. The Graduate School in Business Administration was established to offer the degrees of Master in Business Administration and later, Master in Public Administration. Dr. Leon Ma. Gonzales is the first dean.
1948 With a diversity of approved courses, the MCC was granted the authority to become a bona fide university. Henceforth the institution was known as the Manila Central University. Atty. Tanchoco was the first MCU president.
1949 MCU acquired the Novitiate of San Jose in Caloocan with the goal of relocating the university there. The former novitiate building was renovated to house the College of Medicine. The 10-hectare campus was inaugurated the same year. The MCU Hospital, Nurses’ Home, gymnasium and auditorium were constructed there as well. MCU conferred the honorary degree of Doctor of Pedagogy on Dr. Luther B. Bewley, adviser on education matters of the Office of the President.
1951 The College of Nursing was authorized to offer a four-year nursing course.
1953 The Graduate Pharmacy building was erected. It housed the Industrial Pharmacy and Research Laboratory, the only one of its kind in Asia. MCU conferred the degree of Doctor of Pharmacy honoris causa to Primo Arambulo.
1954 President Ramon F. Magsaysay received the degree of Doctor of Sciences in Public Health, honoris causa.
1955 The School of Midwifery was established.
1959 The College of Optometry was established.
1962 The MCU Medical Alumni Association was formed. Dr. Manuel S. Dijamco served as first MCUMAA president.
1963 The MCU family mourned the passing of the patriarch, Atty. Filemon D. Tanchoco.
1964 Purificacion Gallego-Tanchoco became MCU's second president. MCU started offering BS Medical Technology as a subsidiary to the College of Pharmacy.
1966 The Graduate Education Division offered master studies in Education. Luningning Tanchoco-Estanislao assumed post as Administrator of MCU Hospital.
1970 Dr. Filemon G. Tanchoco Jr., MCU executive vice president and comptroller, organized the project Lingap sa Nayon (LINA) of the World University Service, Philippines. This MCU project became the model for the government's Youth Civil Action Program (YCAP).
1971 The MCU Hospital and the College of Medicine were converted into the Filemon Dionisio Tanchoco Medical Foundation (FDTMF).
1974 The Out-patient Department and Emergency as well as the medical auditorium and an audiovisual room were added to the hospital. MCU's Freddie Cabanilla (College of Medicine, 1974) landed among the Medical Board Exam topnotchers.
1975 MCU Awarded the degree of Doctor of Humanities, honoris causa to Finance Secretary Cesar Virata
1977 Lualhati Tanchoco Gonzalez assumed the post of MCU executive vice president. Renato G. Tanchoco was tapped to take on the role of MCU vice president and treasurer.
1984 The MCU Medical Alumni Association in America was organized to strengthen bonds among U.S.-based alumni and to raise funds for education resources, research and patient care/community services in the Philippines. MCU awarded Atty. Amado Dizon, prolific educator and former MCU acting president, the title of Doctor of Humanities, honoris causa
1985 The MCU Bagong Silang Health Center started as a community extension program. MCU would acquire a lot and build a permanent health center two years later. 
1986 The formal Committee on Research was created to coordinate all scientific researches of the College of Medicine and to publish the college's Philippine Scientific Journal.
1991 MCU launched the University Integrated Community Extension Programs and Services (UNICEPS) in Barangay Portrero, Malabon. Involving seven colleges and later expanding to other areas, UNICEPS adopted a holistic approach to community development that blended medical, dental, optometry, and laboratory services with literacy, sports, livelihood, health education, environmental sanitation, mothercraft and feeding programs. 
1992 The College of Medicine adopted a competency–based curriculum. Renato G. Tanchoco died. 
1993 A Research Unit was organized in the College of Medicine. 
1994 Gallego-Tanchoco died and was succeeded by Dr. Lualhati Tanchoco-Gonzalez as MCU president. The College of Physical Therapy was approved. 
1995 The MCU College of Medicine adopted a curriculum anchored on "problem-based learning" (PBL) as teaching strategy. 
1996 All the colleges were consolidated in one the campus. All the programs in the Manila campuses in Zurbaran and Mayhaligue were transferred to Caloocan. 
1998 The Tanchoco Family Council  was organized, creating a regular venue for the second and third generation clan members to participate formally in setting policy directions and in making major management decisions for MCU.
2001 MCU-FDTMF engaged The Denver Group, a management consultancy organization, to take the key officers through a process of setting  directions for the university in the 21st century. Intensive workshops yielded the Leading Education through Alignment and Responsible Navigation (LEARN) in the Creating the Unique and Revolutionary Endeavor (CURE) change management interventions for MCU and FDTMF, respectively.  Noted economist and former Finance Secretary Jesus P. Estanislao was conferred the title of Doctor of Humanities, honoris causa.  
2003 The Commission on Higher Education selected MCU among the universities and colleges deserving of the grant of autonomy and deregulated status due to academic excellence. Autonomy entitles MCU to, among others, financial incentives and the privilege to prescribe curricular programs to achieve global competence. 
2004 MCU celebrated 100 years of Commitment to the Filipino through Excellence in Education. The university conferred upon Dr. Josette Talamero Biyo, internationally award educator and scientist, the degree of Doctor of Humanities, honoris causa. 
2009 MCU marks its 105th founding anniversary with the installation of Dr. Aristotle Tanchoco Malabanan as the university's fourth president on March 25, 2009, at the school's Centennial Gymnasium. The year's theme was "Unity in Overcoming the Challenges" — the same theme used for its 104th anniversary in 2008.
2010 MCU's Marco Kwan (BSMT, 1986) became the first Filipino Medical Technologist to successfully passed both the IRCA (International Register of Certificated Auditors, UK) ISO 9001 Quality Management System lead auditor's course examination in 2007, and the IRCA 22000 Food Safety Management Systems lead auditor's course examination in 2010.
2017 Dr. Lualhati Tanchoco-Gonzales died.
2018 President Aristotle Tanchoco Malabanan died. Mrs. Chairwoman Luningning Estanislao was initially appointed acting president and later appointed as the official President of Manila Central University. In her term the university celebrated its 113th Anniversary and a new Basic Education Complex was completed. The construction of a new Basic Education complex was the idea of former President Malabanan but this was accomplished in the term of the new president. But the renovation of the MCU-FDTMF is not yet accomplished. This Year will be the new life for Centralinos.

Notable alumni
Salvador Flores, brigadier general
Rizalino Garcia, brigadier general
Uchenna Ikonne, optometry professor
José Corazón de Jesús, poet
Teodoro Kalaw, legislator and scholar
Arsenio Luz, businessman and journalist
Iñigo Ed. Regalado, writer
Rico Robles, disc jockey
Zaldy Zshornack, actor (MCU high school)

See also

List of universities and colleges in the Philippines

External links

MCU Website
Photograph of the Liceo de Manila at Flickr

Medical schools in the Philippines
Dental schools in the Philippines
Universities and colleges in Metro Manila
Education in Caloocan
Educational institutions established in 1904
1904 establishments in the Philippines